Petviashvili (Georgian: ფეტვიაშვილი) is a Georgian surname that may refer to the following notable people:

Rusudan Petviashvili (born 1968), Georgian artist
Vladimir Petviashvili (1936–1993), Soviet physicist from Georgia
Kadomtsev–Petviashvili equation

Georgian-language surnames